Norwegian Public Service Pension Fund is a Norwegian government agency responsible for the extra pensions paid to state employees. There are in excess of one million members, and it has total assets of NOK 270 billion.

All state employees are granted an extra pension of 2% of their gross wages, paid from 67 years of age. Municipal and county employees have their extra pensions managed by Kommunal Landspensjonskasse (KLP). The Pension Fund also manages the extra pensions from a number of government-owned enterprises.

See also 
 Pensions in Norway

Government agencies of Norway
Financial services companies of Norway
1917 establishments in Norway